Spironema may refer to:

Animals:
Spironema (gastropod), Spironema Meek, 1864 – a genus of Cretaceous sea snails

Plants:
Spironema Raf. [1838] – sometimes considered a synonym of Cassytha L. (Lauraceae)
Spironema Lindl. [1840] nom. illeg. hom. – a synonym of Callisia Loefl. (Commelinaceae)
Spironema Hochst. [1842] nom. illeg. hom. – a synonym of Clerodendrum L. (Lamiaceae)

Protists:
Spironema (flagellate), Spironema Klebs, 1893 – a genus of flagellate protists in the family Spironemidae, possibly a synonym of Spironematella P. C. Silva

Spirochaetes:
Spironema Vuillemin, 1905 – a synonym of Treponema Schaudinn, 1905

Microsporidia:
Spironema Léger & Hesse, 1924 – a synonym of Toxoglugea Léger & Hesse, 1924